The 2019 Badminton Asia Championships, was a badminton tournament which took place at the Wuhan Sports Center Gymnasium in China from 23 to 28 April 2019 and had a total purse of $400,000.

Tournament
The 2019 Badminton Asia Championships was the 38th edition of the Badminton Asia Championships. This tournament was hosted by the Chinese Badminton Association, with the sanction of Badminton Asia.

Venue
This international tournament was held at the Wuhan Sports Center Gymnasium in Wuhan, China.

Point distribution
This tournament is graded based on the BWF points system for the BWF World Tour Super 500 event. Below is the table with the point distribution for each phase of the tournament.

Prize money
The total prize money for this year tournament is US$400,000. Distribution of prize money is in accordance with BWF regulations.

Medal summary

Medalists

Medal table

Group stage

Men's singles

Seeds

 Kento Momota (champion)
 Shi Yuqi (final)
 Chou Tien-chen (semifinals)
 Chen Long (quarterfinals)
 Srikanth Kidambi (first round)
 Anthony Sinisuka Ginting (first round)
 Tommy Sugiarto (second round)
 Jonatan Christie (first round)

Finals

Top half

Section 1

Section 2

Bottom half

Section 3

Section 4

Women's singles

Seeds

 Chen Yufei (semifinals)
 Nozomi Okuhara (quarterfinals)
 Akane Yamaguchi (champion)
 P. V. Sindhu (quarterfinals)
 He Bingjiao (final)
 Ratchanok Intanon (withdrew)
 Saina Nehwal (quarterfinals)
 Sung Ji-hyun (first round)

Finals

Top half

Section 1

Section 2

Bottom half

Section 3

Section 4

Men's doubles

Seeds

 Marcus Fernaldi Gideon / Kevin Sanjaya Sukamuljo (final)
 Li Junhui / Liu Yuchen (quarterfinals)
 Takeshi Kamura / Keigo Sonoda (semifinals)
 Mohammad Ahsan / Hendra Setiawan (second round)
 Hiroyuki Endo / Yuta Watanabe (champions)
 Han Chengkai / Zhou Haodong (quarterfinals)
 Fajar Alfian / Muhammad Rian Ardianto (second round)
 Liu Cheng / Zhang Nan (second round)

Finals

Top half

Section 1

Section 2

Bottom half

Section 3

Section 4

Women's doubles

Seeds

 Yuki Fukushima / Sayaka Hirota (semifinals)
 Misaki Matsutomo / Ayaka Takahashi (first round)
 Mayu Matsumoto / Wakana Nagahara (final)
 Chen Qingchen / Jia Yifan (champions)

Finals

Top half

Section 1

Section 2

Bottom half

Section 3

Section 4

Mixed doubles

Seeds

 Zheng Siwei / Huang Yaqiong (semifinals)
 Wang Yilü / Huang Dongping (champions)
 Yuta Watanabe / Arisa Higashino (quarterfinals)
 Dechapol Puavaranukroh / Sapsiree Taerattanachai (semifinals)
 Chan Peng Soon / Goh Liu Ying (second round)
 Seo Seung-jae / Chae Yoo-jung (withdrew)
 Tang Chun Man / Tse Ying Suet (first round)
 Goh Soon Huat / Shevon Jemie Lai (withdrew)

Finals

Top half

Section 1

Section 2

Bottom half

Section 3

Section 4

References

External links
 Tournament Link

Badminton Asia Championships
Asian Badminton Championships
Badminton
Badminton tournaments in China
International sports competitions hosted by China
2019 in Chinese sport
Sport in Wuhan
Badminton Asia Championships